Anatoly Panteleyevich Derevyanko (9 January 1943, Kozmodemyanovka, Amur Oblast) is a Soviet and Russian archaeologist who specializes in the Stone Age of Siberia and the Russian Far East.

Anatoly was born in the workman`s family. In 1963 he graduated from Blagoveshchensk State Pedagogical University (BSPU). Derevyanko was one of the youngest Doctors of Historical Sciences in the Soviet Union. He got a degree in 1971, being 28 years old, for his doctoral thesis «Amur River Region in Antiquity (B. C.)».

Anatoly Derevyanko is the prize-winner of several awards, such as State Prize of the Russian Federation (2001, 2012), The Demidov Prize (2004), The Lomonosov Gold Medal (2015).

Derevyanko has developed the new spatiotemporal version of initial ways of Asia`s settlement, created a periodization, chronology and dynamics of Paleolith in the region. He is the head of program, which is dedicated to the compound research of paleolithic spelaean monuments in South Siberia and Central Asia.

Anatoly Derevyanko was the chancellor of Novosibirsk State University for two years (1980-1982).

References

1943 births
20th-century Russian historians
21st-century Russian historians
Living people
Full Members of the Russian Academy of Sciences
Full Members of the USSR Academy of Sciences
Members of the Montenegrin Academy of Sciences and Arts
Academic staff of Novosibirsk State University
Russian archaeologists
Soviet archaeologists
Demidov Prize laureates
Recipients of the Lenin Komsomol Prize
Recipients of the Lomonosov Gold Medal
Recipients of the Order "For Merit to the Fatherland", 4th class
Recipients of the Order of Honour (Russia)
Recipients of the Order of the Red Banner of Labour
State Prize of the Russian Federation laureates